This is a list of marae (Māori meeting grounds) in Otago.

Dunedin City

Waitaki District

See also
 Lists of marae in New Zealand
 List of schools in Otago

References

Otago, List of marae in
Marae
Marae in Otago, List of